Orthocomotis chaldera is a species of moth of the family Tortricidae. It is found from Tamaulipas in Mexico, through Costa Rica to Peru, Colombia and Ecuador.

References

Moths described in 1889
Orthocomotis